Lila is a novel written by Marilynne Robinson that was published in 2014. Her fourth novel, it is the third installment of the Gilead series, after Gilead and Home. The novel focuses on the courtship and marriage of Lila and John Ames, as well as the backstory of Lila's transient past and her complex attachments. It won the 2014 National Book Critics Circle Award.

Reception
Lila has received widespread acclaim. In a review for The Atlantic Leslie Jamison praised the novel as "brilliant and deeply affecting." In another review, Sarah Churchwell wrote, "Lila... offers Robinson's characteristic delights: glorious prose, subtle wisdom and a darkly numinous atmosphere, lit at moments by a visionary wonder shading into exaltation."

In Books and Culture, Linda Moore offers "a dissenting view", critiquing the Christianity that Robinson writes about as "gospel thin, exiguous, a story slight and wanting, and Flannery isn't here to say so."

Awards 
 2014 National Book Critics Circle Award (Fiction)

References

2014 American novels
Novels by Marilynne Robinson
Farrar, Straus and Giroux books
Third-person narrative novels
National Book Critics Circle Award-winning works